Michael Yang is a Korean American technology entrepreneur and investor. He was born in Seoul, South Korea and moved to San Jose, California on April 2, 1976, with his family when he was 14 years old.

After attending UC Berkeley and Columbia University graduate school, Michael worked for Xerox, Intergraph, Televideo, Samsung and Jazz Multimedia before starting his first venture capital backed startup company mySimon in April 1998.  mySimon was acquired by CNET in 2000 for $700 million during the first Internet boom.

He then started Become.com in January 2004 and raised $37 million in capital from TPG, Transcosmos, EFF and Ron Conway.. Become.com was sold to Shopzilla in 2012.

He moved to Los Angeles in 2013 and started Michael Yang Capital Partners I LP, a hedge fund specializing in disruptive information technology companies in 2017.

Michael has served as member of the IT Advisory Council for President George W. Bush in 2001 and as an advisory board member of Creative Economy Leader advisory group for President Park Geun-hye of South Korea in 2013.

Michael's story has been written about in publications such as Businessweek, MIT Technology Review, and Christianity Today magazines.

References 

MIT Technology Review
San Jose Mercury
E-Commerce Times
Silicon Valley Watcher

1960s births
Living people
American computer businesspeople
Columbia University alumni
Businesspeople from San Jose, California
South Korean businesspeople
South Korean emigrants to the United States
University of California, Berkeley alumni